Otoque Occidente is a district, or corregimiento, in Taboga District, Panamá Province, Panama with a population of 262 as of 2010. Its population as of 1990 was 401; its population as of 2000 was 295.

References

Corregimientos of Panamá Province